Małgorzata Maria Gosiewska (born 22 July 1966 in Gdańsk - née Kierat) is a Deputy Marshal of the Sejm of the Republic of Poland. She was elected to the Sejm on 25 September 2005, getting 4,251 votes in 19 Warsaw district as a candidate from the Law and Justice party list.

Małgorzata Gosiewska was also an expert in the office of President of Poland Lech Kaczyński. Małgorzata Gosiewska was a member of the Masovian Regional Assembly. In 2011, Malgorzata Gosiewska was elected to Polish Sejm - Parliament as MP.

In 2015, team of experts led by Gosiewska published a report on the humanitarian situation during the war in Donbass.

See also
 Members of Polish Sejm 2005-2007
 Members of Polish Sejm 2011-2015
 Members of Polish Sejm 2015-2019

References

External links
Małgorzata Gosiewska - parliamentary page - includes declarations of interest, voting record, and transcripts of speeches.

1966 births
Living people
Politicians from Gdańsk
Women members of the Sejm of the Republic of Poland
Law and Justice politicians
Malgorzata
21st-century Polish women politicians
Deputy Marshals of the Sejm of the Third Polish Republic
Members of the Polish Sejm 2005–2007
Members of the Polish Sejm 2011–2015
Members of the Polish Sejm 2015–2019
Members of the Polish Sejm 2019–2023